Burayev is a Russian masculine surname, its feminine counterpart is Burayeva. Notable people with the surname include:

Atsamaz Burayev (born 1990), Russian football player
Viktor Burayev (born 1982), Russian race walker

Russian-language surnames